Justus Freeland Soule (April 8, 1862 – October 6, 1939) was an American football coach, professor of Latin and Greek, and university administrator. He was on the faculty of the University of Wyoming from the school's founding in 1887 until shortly before his death in 1939. He served as the school's head football coach from 1894 to 1897 and in 1899, compiling an 8–1–1 record.

Early years
Soule was born in Boston and educated at Harvard University.  He moved to Wyoming after graduating from Harvard and spent four years ranching and riding the range.

University of Wyoming
In September 1887, the University of Wyoming was established, and Soule became one of the original faculty members, teaching Latin and Greek. He served on the faculty for more than 50 years, taking emeritus status after reaching the mandatory retirement age. Soule also served as the school's head football coach from 1894 to 1897 and 1899, compiling a record of 8–1–1.  He also served at times as the university's vice president, librarian, liberal arts dean, and dean of men.

Family and death
He was married to Dora Simpson. They had three children: Harold, Margaret, and Robert Homer. Son Robert became a general officer in the United States Army.

Soule died in October 1939 while staying with his son in Fort Leavenworth, Kansas.  He was buried at the Greenhill Cemetery in Laramie, Wyoming.

Head coaching record

References

External links
 

1862 births
1939 deaths
University of Wyoming faculty
Wyoming Cowboys football coaches
Harvard University alumni
Sportspeople from Boston